Dirk Powell (born 1969) is an American fiddler, banjo player, and singer. Powell was born in Oberlin, Ohio into a family with deep Kentucky roots. He has lived in Louisiana since 1992. He is considered one of the world's leading experts on traditional Appalachian fiddle and banjo styles. Powell is also a recording engineer and producer, with his own studio, the Cypress House, in Breaux Bridge, near Lafayette, Louisiana. The studio is in a converted 1850s Louisiana Creole home on Bayou Teche and focuses on vintage gear and audio..

Powell has won four Grammy Awards and has been a guest on American television shows including Late Night with David Letterman, the Today Show, and American Masters. For ten years, he was Joan Baez's "band." He was a longtime member of the Cajun band Balfa Toujours. Currently, he is performing as a solo artist, as a featured artist with Transatlantic Sessions, on tour with Mary Chapin Carpenter, and as a duo with Rainy Eyes. Powell has recorded with Rhiannon Giddens, Loretta Lynn, Irma Thomas, Tim O'Brien, the Raconteurs on their record “Consolers of the Lonely,” and Eric Clapton.

Powell has worked on or scored numerous films over the years, including Cold Mountain, In the Electric Mist, Stevie, and Ride with the Devil.  He recently collaborated on the score for Sundance award-winning documentary Descendant.

Discography
 If I Go Ten Thousand Miles (Rounder, 1996)
 Songs from the Mountain (Howdy Skies, 1999)
 Tony Furtado & Dirk Powell (Rounder, 1999)
 Hand Me Down (Rounder, 1999)
 Time Again (Rounder, 2004)
 A Fret Free Christmas (Valcour, 2010)
 Walking Through Clay (Sugar Hill/Welk Music Group, 2014)
 I Wanna Sing Right: Rediscovering Lomax in the Evangeline Country four-EP set - various artists (Valcour Records, 2015)
 Cajun Accordion Kings (and the Queen) various artists (Valcour Records, 2015)
 When I Wait for You (Vertical, 2020)

See also Balfa Toujours.

References

American male composers
21st-century American composers
American banjoists
American folk singers
American record producers
American male songwriters
Grammy Award winners
Appalachian music
Appalachian culture
Living people
21st-century American male musicians
People from Oberlin, Ohio
1969 births